A list of notable Afghan philosophers:

J
 Jamal ad-Din al-Afghani

S
 Sediq Afghan
 Saifuddin Jalal
 Sayed Hassan Akhlaq

 
Afghan